Cassidy Janson (born 30 July 1980) is a British actress, known for her work in musical theatre. She won the 2020 Olivier Award for Best Supporting Performance in a Musical for & Juliet.

Stage career 
In 2005 Janson appeared in Tick, Tick... Boom! at the Menier Chocolate Factory. She played Susan, alongside Neil Patrick Harris as Jonathan and Tee Jaye Susan as Michael.
In 2006 she joined the original West End cast of Wicked as part of the ensemble, later moving to be standby for the role of Elphaba. Following this, she joined the final West End cast of Avenue Q as Kate Monster/Lucy the Slut.
In 2011 she originated the role of Maggie Saunders in the musical version of Lend me a Tenor. She appears on the original cast recording.

Janson has appeared in several shows Off-West End, including Company at the Southwark Playhouse (as Amy), Rooms: A Rock Romance at the Finborough Theatre (as Monica), and Blood Wedding at the Courtyard Theatre

In 2013 she returned to the Menier Chocolate Factory in Candide, playing the role of Paquette. Following this, she played Ruth in Dessa Rose at the Trafalgar Studios, alongside Cynthia Erivo as Dessa.

On 30 November 2015 Janson took over the role of Carole King in the West End production of Beautiful: The Carole King Musical. She joined Carole King at the British Summer Time concerts to perform I Feel The Earth Move. She remained with the production until it closed on 5 August 2017.

In 2018 she appeared in a revival of Chess as Florence at the London Colosseum, alongside Michael Ball, Alexandra Burke and Tim Howar.

In April 2019 she appeared in Man of La Mancha at the London Colosseum, sharing the roles of Aldonza and Dulcinea with Danielle de Niese. The production played a limited run to 8 June 2019. Following this, she has been cast in the new musical & Juliet, which is currently showing on the West End at the Shaftesbury Theatre. She stars as Anne Hathaway, William Shakespeare's love, Shakespeare being portrayed by Oliver Tompsett. Janson won an Olivier Award in the category of Best Supporting Actress in a Musical for her performance of Anne Hathaway.

Leading Ladies 

In 2017 Janson teamed up with Beverley Knight and Amber Riley to form a musical theatre supergroup, known collectively as the "Leading Ladies". Their debut album, Songs from the Stage, was released on 17 November 2017 and features covers songs from Cats, Beautiful and Rent among others.

Debut album 

Cassidy Janson announced via her Twitter in late 2018 that she had signed a record deal with BMG. In April 2019 Janson announced that her debut album Cassidy would be released on 14 June. It features 14 new songs, 12 co-written by Janson herself, and new song written for her by legend and friend Carole King.

References 

Living people
English stage actresses
English musical theatre actresses
1980 births
Leading Ladies (group) members